KOKU (100.3 FM) – branded as Hit Radio 100 – is a commercial contemporary hit radio (CHR) radio station licensed to Hagåtña, Guam. The station is currently owned by Moy Communications, Inc. It signed on the air on June 1, 1984.

It is currently one of three CHR/Top 40 outlets on Guam, and one of two CHR outlets in the Guam market, competing against KNUT.

History 
KOKU, which signed on on June 1, 1984, has been launched a contemporary hit radio in its two incarnations, from 1984 to 2003 (it picked up the slogan in 1989, and was known as "Guam's Party station" until 2003, later renamed as "Guam's Bomb Station" until 2006), and as of 2016, when it changed the current slogan as "Guam #1 Hit Music Station."

As of October 2, 2012, KOKU has a new sister station as KMOY, which has adult top 40 as "Cool FM 92.7".

DJs

Current 
 Ronnie Perez
 Shanice Poe
 Richard "Rich" Borden
 Rayden Carter

Former 
 Kimberly Teves
 Jovan Tamayo

External links
 Hit Radio 100 Facebook website
 
 

OKU
1984 establishments in Guam
Radio stations established in 1984
Hagåtña, Guam